Levipalatum texanum is a free-living nematode (roundworm) in the family Diplogastridae. The species is androdioecious, consisting of self-fertile hermaphrodites which are morphologically females, and males. It is known from the south-eastern United States and has been found to live in association with scarab beetles (Cyclocephala sp.), although it has also been baited from soil. Nematodes of this species can be cultured on bacterium Escherichia coli in the laboratory, and they are presumed to also feed on microorganisms in the wild. Levipalatum is a monotypic genus.

References

Nematodes described in 2014
Diplogastridae